The 2006 TAC Cup season was the 15th season of the TAC Cup competition. Oakleigh Chargers have won there 1st premiership title after defeating the Calder Cannons in the grand final by 27 points.

Ladder

Grand final

References 

NAB League
Nab League